Taphrina johansonii is an ascomycete fungus that is a plant pathogen. It causes "tongue" galls on poplar trees.

References

Fungal tree pathogens and diseases
Taphrinomycetes
Fungi described in 1890